Union Township is a township in Nodaway County, in the U.S. state of Missouri.

Union Township was established in 1856.

References

Townships in Missouri
Townships in Nodaway County, Missouri